The 2017 Indian Open was a professional ranking snooker tournament that took place between 12 and 16 September 2017 in Vishakhapatnam, India. It was the fourth ranking event of the 2017/2018 season.

Qualifying took place between 1–2 August 2017 in Preston, England.

Anthony McGill was the defending champion, having beaten Kyren Wilson 5–2 in the 2016 final. McGill reached the final again but was beaten by John Higgins, who won his 29th ranking event.

Prize fund
The breakdown of prize money for this year is shown below:

 Winner: £50,000
 Runner-up: £25,000
 Semi-final: £15,000
 Quarter-final: £10,000
 Last 16: £6,000
 Last 32: £4,000
 Last 64: £2,000

 Televised highest break: £2,000
 Total: £323,000

The "rolling 147 prize" for a maximum break stood at £25,000.

Main draw

Final

Qualifying
These matches were held between 1 and 2 August 2017 at the Preston Guild Hall in Preston, England. All matches were best of 7 frames.

Notes

Century breaks

Qualifying stage centuries

Total: 18

 139  Michael Georgiou
 128  Dominic Dale
 126  Sam Craigie
 121  Eden Sharav
 117  Mark Joyce
 114  Gary Wilson
 113  Yu Delu
 109  Jimmy Robertson
 108  Daniel Wells

 104  Stephen Maguire
 103  Jimmy White
 102  Zhang Anda
 102  Mike Dunn
 101  Peter Ebdon
 101  Fergal O'Brien
 101  Allan Taylor
 101  Mitchell Mann
 100  Josh Boileau

Televised stage centuries

Total: 14

 141  Zhou Yuelong
 135  Kurt Maflin
 125, 105, 102  Shaun Murphy
 122, 102  John Higgins
 112, 102  David Gilbert

 112  Stephen Maguire
 110  Mark King
 108  Alan McManus
 103  Gary Wilson
 101  Stuart Bingham

References

2017
Indian Open
Indian Open (snooker)
Indian Open
Sport in Visakhapatnam